Edgar Olmos (born April 12, 1990) is an American former professional baseball pitcher. He made his Major League Baseball (MLB) debut with the Miami Marlins in 2013, and has also played for the Seattle Mariners and in Nippon Professional Baseball for the Chiba Lotte Marines.

Career

Florida/Miami Marlins
Olmos attended Birmingham High School in Van Nuys, California, and was selected by the Marlins in the third round of the 2008 MLB Draft. He made his professional debut for the GCL Marlins. He only played in 3 games in 2009 and spent the 2010 season with the Single-A Greensboro Grasshoppers, pitching to a 3–9 record and 4.37 ERA in 25 games. He spent the next year with the High-A Jupiter Hammerheads, but struggled to a 4–17 record and 6.63 ERA. In 2012, Olmos split the season between the Double-A Jacksonville Suns and Jupiter, pitching to a 1–6 record and 3.74 ERA. He began the 2013 season in Jacksonville.

The Marlins promoted Olmos to the major leagues on June 3, 2013. Olmos made 5 appearances for Miami in 2013, but allowed 9 runs in 5.0 innings of work. He did not appear in a major league game in 2014, instead playing in the minors with the Triple-A New Orleans Zephyrs and Jacksonville.

Seattle Mariners
The Seattle Mariners claimed Olmos off waivers on November 20, 2014. On February 13, 2015, he was designated for assignment by the Mariners when they signed free agent Rickie Weeks, He was subsequently claimed by the Texas Rangers off waivers on February 24. Olmos reported to training camp with a shoulder injury, which caused him to be shut down. On March 4, 2015, the Rangers reversed their waiver claim, sending him back to the Mariners. He made six appearances for the Mariners in 2015, pitching to a 4.50 earned run average (ERA), and in 20 games for the Tacoma Rainiers of the Class AAA Pacific Coast League, pitching to a 3.55 ERA.

The Mariners designated Olmos for assignment on December 2.

Chicago Cubs
The Chicago Cubs claimed Olmos off waivers on December 4,

Baltimore Orioles
The Baltimore Orioles acquired Olmos off waivers on December 10, 2015.

Second Stint with Cubs
Olmos was reclaimed by the Cubs on December 23, 2015. However, he was again designated for assignment on February 12, 2016.

Second Stint with Orioles
The Orioles acquired Olmos on March 24, 2016, in exchange for a player to be named later. He became a free agent after season. He spent the season in Triple-A with the Norfolk Tides and elected free agency on November 7, 2016.

Boston Red Sox
On November 16, 2016, Olmos signed a minor league contract with the Boston Red Sox. He spent the season with the Triple-A Pawtucket Red Sox and elected free agency on November 6, 2017.

Chiba Lotte Marines
On December 13, 2017, Olmos signed with the Chiba Lotte Marines of Nippon Professional Baseball (NPB) on December 13. He became a free agent following the 2018 season after recording a 7.71 ERA in 2 appearances.

Toros de Tijuana
On January 16, 2020, Olmos signed with the Toros de Tijuana of the Mexican League for the 2019 season. Olmos did not play in a game in 2020 due to the cancellation of the Mexican League season because of the COVID-19 pandemic. He later became a free agent.

References

External links

1990 births
Living people
Major League Baseball pitchers
Baseball players from Los Angeles
Miami Marlins players
Seattle Mariners players
Gulf Coast Marlins players
Jamestown Jammers players
Greensboro Grasshoppers players
Jupiter Hammerheads players
Jacksonville Suns players
New Orleans Zephyrs players
Glendale Desert Dogs players
Salt River Rafters players
Tacoma Rainiers players
Norfolk Tides players
Pawtucket Red Sox players
Birmingham High School alumni